'Phantoms' is a 2015 EP by Freezepop. It features three new tracks and four remixes of Freezepop's songs. It was released on iTunes on November 12, 2015.

The band played a release show for this specific EP at Thunder Road on November 14, 2015.

Track listing

References

External links 
 Freezepop.net
 https://www.discogs.com/Freezepop-Phantoms/release/7811823
 https://itunes.apple.com/us/album/phantoms/id1060274130
 https://www.amazon.com/Phantoms-Freezepop/dp/B018F6REWM

Freezepop albums
2015 EPs